Kempston Hardwick railway station serves the village of Kempston Hardwick in Bedfordshire, England. It should not be confused with the nearby town of Kempston. The station has two platforms next to a half-barrier level crossing.

Kempston Hardwick was the least used station in Bedfordshire up until the publication of passenger numbers in November 2021. The least used station in Bedfordshire is currently Millbrook.

Services
Kempston Hardwick is served by West Midlands Trains (previously London Midland), using Class 230 multiple units. One service runs each hour in either direction (except Sundays). The running line through this area has been upgraded to enable the speed limit for passenger trains to increase from 40 to 60 mph.

Community Rail Partnership
Kempston Hardwick station, in common with others on the Marston Vale Line, is covered by the Marston Vale Community Rail Partnership, which aims to increase use of the line by involving local people.

History
The level crossing at Kempston Hardwick was opened in 1846 with the construction of the Bedford Railway Company railway line between Bedford (St Johns railway station) and Bletchley.

An agreement with the London and Birmingham Railway was made whereby the railway was to be constructed and operated by the London & Birmingham Railway company, who under the terms of  "The Bedford and the London and Birmingham Railway Act 1846" split the profits from the operation of the line.  During the construction of the line however the London and Birmingham Railway merged with the Grand Junction Railway to form the London and North Western Railway company.

Their opening coincided with the introduction of a steam railmotor on the Varsity Line; the station platform initially consisted of wooden sleepers laid at ground level for a carriage length. All three closed as a wartime economy measure during the First World War and two were closed during Second World War, never to reopen, leaving Kempston Hardwick as the only survivor. Its survival can be attributed to its convenient location for the nearby Eastwood's Brickworks which was served from 1928 by a private siding on the up side of the line.

The level crossing alongside the station was once controlled by a crossing keeper who lived in a lodge adjacent to his place of work. This was demolished in the 1980s. 

In 2003, it was reported that Kempston Hardwick was one of the quietest stations in England as only 38 passengers per month were reported to be using it. Two reasons offered for the lack of custom were the absence of signage indicating the station from the main road, and the lack of parking facilities. Following the release of this story, Silverlink together with Bedfordshire County Council confirmed that they would not be seeking the closure of the station. Station patronage has, however, now increased, according to the Community Rail Partnership which attributes the rise to the creation of significant numbers of jobs in the area. In 2008, it was announced that the area around the railway station could be the location of a new eco-town.

References

External links

DfT Category F2 stations
Former London and North Western Railway stations
Railway stations in Great Britain opened in 1905
Railway stations in Great Britain closed in 1917
Railway stations in Great Britain opened in 1919
Railway stations served by West Midlands Trains
Kempston
East West Rail